Yury Aleksandrovich Shlyapin (January 11, 1932 – July 8, 2009) was a Russian water polo player who competed for the Soviet Union in the 1952 Summer Olympics and in the 1956 Summer Olympics.

In 1952 he was part of the Soviet team which finished seventh in the Olympic water polo tournament. He played five matches.

Four years later he won the bronze medal with the Soviet team in the 1956 tournament. He played all seven matches.

See also
 List of Olympic medalists in water polo (men)

References
Yury Shlyapin's obituary 
Biography of Yury Shlyapin

External links
 

1932 births
2009 deaths
Russian male water polo players
Soviet male water polo players
Olympic water polo players of the Soviet Union
Water polo players at the 1952 Summer Olympics
Water polo players at the 1956 Summer Olympics
Olympic bronze medalists for the Soviet Union
Olympic medalists in water polo
Medalists at the 1956 Summer Olympics